KLBC is a radio station airing a country music format licensed to Durant, Oklahoma, broadcasting on 106.3 MHz FM.  The station serves the areas of Durant, Oklahoma, and Denison, Texas, and is owned by Kinion Whittington, through licensee Mid-Continental Broadcasting, LLC.

References

External links
KLBC's official website

Country radio stations in the United States
LBC